Seymour Weiss (September 13, 1896 – September 17, 1969)  was a prominent  hotel executive and civic leader from New Orleans, Louisiana, who was a close confidant of the legendary Huey Pierce Long, Jr. Weiss, the most loyal of the Longites, bore the same last name as the apparent Long assassin, Carl Weiss, M.D.

Background

Weiss was born in Bunkie in Avoyelles Parish and died in the capital city of Baton Rouge. His parents were Samuel Weiss, originally from Austria-Hungary and a merchant, and the former Gisella Elias, of Berlin, Germany. Seymour had three brothers: Bernard, Milton, and Julius. On January 10, 1954, Bernard and Milton died in a private airplane crash, along with Thomas Elmer Braniff, the owner of the airline, and a number of other civic leaders from Shreveport, Louisiana, and Dallas, Texas. The men had been on a private hunting trip to South Texas and South Louisiana; the plane crashed in a freak ice storm. Weiss' last brother, Julius, died later the same year on August 30, 1954, of personal health issues. Seymour was educated in public schools in Bunkie and Abbeville in Vermilion Parish. For a time he was a department store clerk in Alexandria in Rapides Parish and the largest city in Central Louisiana. He moved to New Orleans in 1916 to clerk in a shoe store. After the United States' entry into World War I, Weiss attended officers' training at Camp Gordon, Georgia, but the conflict ended before Weiss finished his training. Thereafter, he returned to New Orleans to resume work as a shoe clerk.

Seymour was married twice: on April 19, 1925, to Notie "Fay" Turner, and then on June 12, 1963, to Elva Mae Lavie Kimball, whom he predeceased. He died in Baton Rouge and is interred at the family plot at Metairie Cemetery in New Orleans. (Plot: Sec. 34, Lot 19).

The Roosevelt Hotel
In 1923, Weiss became the manager of a barbershop at the Grunewald Hotel in New Orleans. In 1924, he became the assistant hotel manager, and in 1928, he was promoted to hotel manager. First built in 1893, and known as the "Grunewald" (for its original owner, Louis Grunewald), the Grunewald opened what has been called the first nightclub in the United States, a basement room decorated with fake stalactites called "The Cave", where one could watch dancing chorus girls and listen to Dixieland jazz that would easily drown out the soothing indoor waterfalls. In 1923, a consortium of local investors purchased the hotel and renamed it "The Roosevelt" in honor of President Theodore Roosevelt, who had died four years earlier.

In 1931, Weiss was named president of the New Orleans Roosevelt Corp. From 1931–1965, he was the principal owner and managing director of the Roosevelt. The Cave was closed in favor of a larger venue a floor above called "The Blue Room" which became a nationally prominent music venue. Weiss sold the Roosevelt in 1965. It became the Fairmont Hotel until closing following Hurricane Katrina. In August 2007, Dimension Development Company, Inc, a Natchitoches, Louisiana-based hotel development and management company purchased the property, and restored the building with a scheduled opening date of June 25, 2009. Dimension Development Company Inc, entered into an agreement with Hilton Worldwide to brand the hotel under Hilton's premier Waldorf Astoria collection. The hotel has been rechristened The Roosevelt Hotel by Waldorf Astoria. A grand opening was held in 2009. Businessman Sam Friedman of Natchitoches was heavily involved in the reopening. He is the son of the late Louisiana State Senator Sylvan Friedman. 
Although Weiss had no children, he was an uncle to Seymour Weiss, II, and S J. Weiss. His wife and sister-in-law died in a car accident, leaving behind two widowers, and two motherless children, one thirteen and one three. The father, his brother, took the thirteen-year-old, S.J., and the grandparents and Seymour took Seymour, II. Seymour, his parents, and "Little Seymour" lived in the hotel. Little Seymour married Sally McNulty and fathered Richard, David, and John Weiss.

Loyal to Huey Long
Weiss became a political booster of Huey Long, whom he met during the 1928 gubernatorial campaign. Weiss acted as Long's chief of protocol and resolved an unwitting comical dispute that developed when the governor received a German delegation at Mardi Gras in 1930 in a pair of pajamas, a red and blue robe, and blue bedroom slippers.

Long made Weiss's Roosevelt Hotel his New Orleans headquarters. It was said that Weiss made sure Long never got lost in the hallways of the large facility. Weiss was the closest of friends and a regular golfing partner with Long. He was easily considered an "insider at Long's right hand." Weiss was present at the bedside of Long when he died from internal infection contracted during the attempt to remove the bullets in the assassination attempt.

Weiss became treasurer of both the Louisiana Democratic Association and Long's secret political fund. During the Great Depression, Weiss had control of federal relief funds in Louisiana. He was vice-president of the Win or Lose Corporation, a controversial oil company whose structure was devised by Huey Long. On Long's death, Weiss chaired the Huey P. Long Memorial Commission and remained active in the Long machine until scandals swept through the organization.

Imprisonment for tax evasion
In 1934, Weiss was indicted by a federal grand jury in New Orleans on tax evasion charges. He paid back taxes after the charges were dropped. He was indicted again on tax evasion and mail fraud charges growing out of the "Louisiana Scandals" of the late 1930s. He was convicted and imprisoned for sixteen months between 1940 and 1942, before he was paroled and ordered to pay back taxes. In 1947, he was given a full and unconditional pardon by Democratic U.S. President Harry Truman.

Weiss as civic leader
Weiss was a member of the New Orleans Zoning Board and commissioner of the municipal fire and police departments between 1932 and 1936. He was also president of the board of commissioners of the Port of New Orleans from 1933–1938.

He was active in the American Hotel Association and was president of the Louisiana Hotel-Motel and the New Orleans Hotel associations. He won statewide awards for hotel management in 1952 and 1957. He was a director of the New Orleans chapter of the American Red Cross, the Chamber of Commerce, and the International Trade Mart. In 1968, Weiss chaired the committee for the 250th anniversary of the founding of New Orleans.

"Seymour Weiss" appears in these books
 at least 25 references in Huey Long Invades New Orleans: The Siege of a City, 1934–36 by Garry Boulard (Author)
 at least 25 references in Huey Long (Vintage) by T. Harry Williams (Author)
 at least 25 references in Louisiana Hayride by Harnett Kane (Author)
 4 references in Deep Politics And The Death of JFK by Peter Dale Scott (Author)
 4 references in The Wizards of Armageddon (Stanford Nuclear Age Series) by Fred M. Kaplan (Author)
 4 references in Those Swinging Years: The Autobiography of Charlie Barnet by Charlie Barnet (Author), Stanley Dance (Author)
 3 references in The Wonderful Era of the Great Dance Bands (A Da Capo Paperback) by Leo Walker
 3 references in Gerald L. K. Smith: Minister of Hate by Glen Jeansonne
 2 references in Myself Among Others by George Wein (Author)

A listing of collected artifacts from the estate of Seymour Weiss, donated by his second wife, Elva Weiss, can be found in the Louisiana State University Collection of "The Seymour Weiss Papers" Inventoried & Compiled by Sunny Stein, the Louisiana and Lower Mississippi Valley Collections, the Special Collections, Hill Memorial Library, and the Louisiana State University Libraries at Baton Rouge, Louisiana in the Fall of 1999. A listing of contents may be viewed at:
https://web.archive.org/web/20060902085923/http://www.lib.lsu.edu/special/findaid/s4165.html

See also
List of people pardoned or granted clemency by the president of the United States

References

External links
 "Seymour Weiss", A Dictionary of Louisiana Biography, Vol. 2 (1988), pp. 831–832.
 Article discussing the history of the Roosevelt Hotel
  Article By Ronnie Virgets concerning Huey Long's relationship with Seymour Weiss & the Roosevelt Hotel.
  Article discussing the history of the Roosevelt Hotel's famed "Blue Room," and it house band – "Leon Kelner and his Orchestra."
 "First as the Grunewald, then as The Roosevelt, and now The Fairmont New Orleans

An archived article from Time in partnership with CNN titled, "For Tarpon," and posted Monday, May 10, 1937, is a discussion of a visit by President Franklin D. Roosevelt, and references Seymour Weiss as a "Longster" for his close relationship with Huey Long. The article notes the Bonnet Carre Spillway, built by the U.S. government to protect against flooding.
 

An archived article from Time in partnership with CNN titled, "One Down," Posted Monday, September 25, 1939, discusses when a scandal broke its levees in Louisiana in the summer of 1939. Governor and Senator Huey Long was dead, and his heirs: ex-Governor Richard Webster Leche, New Orleans Mayor Robert Sidney Maestri, and New Orleans hotelman Seymour Weiss, were facing government charges, including mail fraud.
 

A commercial representation of today's Fairmount Hotel – it history under Weiss and conveniences today.
 

Bob Hope came to New Orleans on July 14, 1955, to play in a golf match at Lakewood Country Club to benefit the United Cerebral Palsy Association. His partner was to be Seymour Weiss and his opponents Mrs. Sam Israel, Jr., and Edward B. Silverstein.
 

1896 births
1969 deaths
Businesspeople from New Orleans
Politicians from New Orleans
Louisiana Democrats
People from Bunkie, Louisiana
People from Abbeville, Louisiana
People from Alexandria, Louisiana
Louisiana politicians convicted of crimes
Louisiana local politicians
Jewish American people in Louisiana politics
Clerks
Recipients of American presidential pardons
American businesspeople convicted of crimes
20th-century American politicians
Burials at Metairie Cemetery
Huey Long